DeVon D. Bean (born 13 September 1975) currently 42 years old, is a former Bermudan sprinter who competed in the men's 100m competition at the 1996 Summer Olympics. He recorded a 10.89, not enough to qualify for the next round past the heats. His personal best, 10.27, was set in the same year and is the Bermudian National record over the 100 meters. Devon also recorded a 7.88m long jump and placed 7th overall at the 2000 Summer Olympics.

Outdoor records

Indoor records

References

2.https://www.iaaf.org/athletes/bermuda/devon-bean-130142

1975 births
Bermudian male sprinters
Athletes (track and field) at the 1996 Summer Olympics
Olympic athletes of Bermuda
Athletes (track and field) at the 1999 Pan American Games
Pan American Games competitors for Bermuda
Living people